Lloyd Braun (born 1958) is an American media executive. He is the founder and CEO of Whalerock Industries, a Los Angeles based media and technology company.

Early life and education

Braun was born in New York, the son of Merna and David Braun, a renowned music industry attorney who was Bob Dylan's lawyer and was involved in the founding of Rock and Roll Hall of Fame. He was raised in New Hyde Park.  He earned a B.A. degree from Vassar College in 1980, and received a J.D. degree from the University of California's Hastings College of the Law in 1983.

Career
Braun began his career as an entertainment attorney. His clients included Larry David, Howard Stern and David Chase. The character Lloyd Braun on the sitcom Seinfeld, created by David, was named after him. In an interview between Larry David and Howard Stern, David said that a conversation he had with Braun about Braun's father served as a "jumping-off point" for the writing of his Broadway play Fish in the Dark. David Chase credited Braun with encouraging him to create the TV series that eventually became The Sopranos.

American Broadcasting Company
Braun went on to serve as the Chairman of the ABC Entertainment Group from 2002 to 2004. He was forced out of his position at ABC shortly after greenlighting the $13 million pilot to the television show Lost, one of the most expensive in modern broadcasting.  The script of Lost had been heavily criticized by Michael Eisner and Robert Iger, who were CEO and COO of ABC's parent Disney; nonetheless, Braun pushed on with filming the pilot episode in Hawaii saying "If we are pregnant enough, they won't shut us down". Braun's decision was vindicated, however, when the show went on to become a huge success. Braun and his partner, Susan Lyne, also greenlit other ABC shows that went on to great success in the years following his dismissal, including Desperate Housewives, Extreme Makeover Home Edition, Boston Legal and Grey's Anatomy.  These shows began an unprecedented turnaround for ABC.

Yahoo! Media Group and Whalerock Industries
In November 2004, Braun joined Yahoo! to run Yahoo! Media Group, the company's content division. While at Yahoo!, Braun initiated and oversaw the development of the highly successful celebrity site OMG! Braun also developed the daily video show "The 9" and oversaw major redesigns of Yahoo!'s media sites. Braun resigned from Yahoo! in December 2006 to partner with Gail Berman to form the entertainment company BermanBraun.

BermanBraun entered into a strategic alliance with NBC to create television programming for which NBC would have a first look. In August 2010, BermanBraun announced a multiyear partnership with Starcom MediaVest to create new digital content and advertising solutions available "first" to SMG clients. SMG is part of Publicis Groupe, the world's third-largest communications group. Since 2007, BermanBraun has established itself in content production, with properties across three platforms: television, digital and film. In scripted television, BermanBraun is currently producing Alphas on the Syfy network. Also in production is the second season of the unscripted series Brad Meltzer's Decoded for History Channel and Unchained Reaction, to be produced with MythBusters stars Jamie Hyneman and Adam Savage for Discovery Channel. BermanBraun is also launching two unscripted shows: Polyamory for Showtime and Junk Gypsies for HGTV later in 2012.

In March 2012, BermanBraun purchased Whiskey Media, acquiring the websites Tested, Screened, and Anime Vice.  Tested was quickly redesigned and rebranded as MythBusters' Jamie Hyneman and Adam Savage's personal website.

In February 2014, Braun became the sole owner of BermanBraun, renaming the company Whalerock Industries.

Personal life
He and his wife Lauren (née Michelson) are members of Kehillat Israel, a Reconstructionist congregation in Pacific Palisades, Los Angeles

References

External links

1958 births
Living people
American television executives
20th-century American Jews
Vassar College alumni
Members of the Vassar College Board of Trustees
University of California, Hastings College of the Law alumni
American Broadcasting Company executives
Presidents of American Broadcasting Company Entertainment
American Reconstructionist Jews
21st-century American Jews